Luis Espinal Higher Institute of Philosophy and Humanities (Instituto Superior de Filosofía y Humanidades "Luis Espinal") is a Jesuit-run university in Cochabamba, Bolivia.

The Institute is named after Luís Espinal Camps, a Jesuit priest, poet, educator, and social justice activist.

See also
 List of Jesuit sites

References  

Universities in Bolivia
Jesuit universities and colleges
Educational institutions established in 2003
2003 establishments in Bolivia